The Church of God (Holiness) is an association of autonomous holiness Christian congregations.  Originating in the 19th century, it is aligned with conservative holiness movement of Methodism. With respect to ecumenism, the Church of God is a member of the Global Wesleyan Alliance and Interchurch Holiness Convention.

History
The Church of God (Holiness) began on March 29, 1883, with the founding of a church in Centralia, Missouri with 44 members. Those involved in this effort were:  J. F. Watkins, N. T. Sneed, H. A. Foster, G. R. Sneed, F. H. Sumter, J. B. Ceighton, J. H. Allen, D. C. Brenneman, G. W. Petty, Isaiah Reid, T. B. Bratton, A. L. Brewer, A. M. Kiergan, and W. T. Bean.  The movement grew out of a group of former members of the Methodist Episcopal Church that had been participating in the Southwestern Holiness Association. The leading cause of their departure from the Methodist Church was their zealous propagation of a unique interpretation of the doctrine of entire sanctification that differed from the rest of the Methodist Church. One of the early leaders was John Petit Brooks (1826–1915), who was editor of The Church Witness, which subsequently merged with The Good Way, to become the Church Herald, which later merged with the Church Advocate and Holiness Banner to become The Church Herald and Holiness Banner. He left the Methodist Episcopal Church circa 1886.

Beliefs
The idea of church is for believers to come together as a body, and to have fellowship with other believers. God desires that we come to Him with a repentant heart and a desire to know Him more fully.

Organization
The Church of God (Holiness) has about 120 congregations in the United States, with the majority in Missouri and Kansas. Additionally they have 12 congregations on the Navajo Reservation, 13 Spanish-speaking congregations in California, Texas, New York and Colorado, a Korean ministry in Overland Park, Kansas, and two Haitian works in New York and Florida.  The church also has a sizeable outgrowth in the Cayman Islands. Ministry departments of the church include Home Missions, World Missions, Harmony Hill Youth Ministries, and the Herald and Banner Press. Headquarters are located in Overland Park, Kansas. A general church conference is held annually in Overland Park. World missions works are found in Bolivia, the British West Indies, the Virgin Islands, Ghana, Nigeria, India, Myanmar, Papua New Guinea, Colombia, Cuba, Haiti, Jamaica, and Ukraine.

Ecumenism
With respect to ecumenism, the Church of God is a member of the Global Wesleyan Alliance and the Interchurch Holiness Convention.

Education
The Church of God (Holiness) is associated with Kansas Christian College in Overland Park.  This institution gives degrees in ministry, business leadership, psychology, and education.  The headquarters for the church is located on the campus and the General Camp and Convention are also held here.
The church is also associated with several private elementary and secondary schools.  These are El Dorado Christian School in Eldorado Springs, Missouri; Fort Scott Christian Heights in Fort Scott, Kansas; Gravette Holiness Bible School in Gravette, Arkansas; Lowry City Christian School in Lowry City, Missouri; Mount Zion Bible School in Ava, Missouri; Mountain State Christian School in Culloden, West Virginia; and Overland Christian Schools in Overland Park.

References

External links
Church of God (Holiness) - Official Web Site
Home Missions Department
World Missions Department
Kansas Christian College
Harmony Hill Youth Ministries
HHYC Young Adult Missions Program
Herald and Banner Press

Centralia, Missouri
Religious organizations established in 1883
Church of God denominations
Holiness denominations
Evangelical denominations in North America
Christian denominations established in the 19th century
Protestant denominations established in the 19th century
1883 establishments in Missouri